Wipfratal is a former municipality in the district Ilm-Kreis, in Thuringia, Germany. On 1 January 2019, it was merged into the town Arnstadt.

Wipratal consisted of the following villages: Branchewinda, Dannheim, Ettischleben, Görbitzhausen, Hausen, Kettmanshausen, Marlishausen, Neuroda, Reinsfeld, Roda, Schmerfeld and Wipfra.

References

Former municipalities in Thuringia
Ilm-Kreis